Ailill Flann Bec, son of Fiachu Muillethan, was an Irish dynast belonging to the Deirgtine, the proto-historical ancestors of the historical Eóganachta dynasties of Munster. He was the father of Luigthech, also known as Lugaid, and thus the grandfather of Conall Corc. Another son of Ailill Flann Bec may have been Dáire Cerbba, but there is evidence against this.

He was adopted by and succeeded his elder brother Ailill Flann Mór, who left no issue.

References

 Kuno Meyer (ed.), "The Laud Genealogies and Tribal Histories", in Zeitschrift für celtische Philologie 8. Halle/Saale, Max Niemeyer. 1912. Pages 291-338.
 Michael A. O'Brien (ed.) with intr. by John V. Kelleher, Corpus genealogiarum Hiberniae. DIAS. 1976. / partial digital edition: Donnchadh Ó Corráin (ed.), Genealogies from Rawlinson B 502. University College, Cork: Corpus of Electronic Texts. 1997.
 John O'Donovan (ed. and tr.), Annála Ríoghachta Éireann. Annals of the Kingdom of Ireland by the Four Masters, from the Earliest Period to the Year 1616. 7 vols. Royal Irish Academy. Dublin. 1848-51. 2nd edition, 1856.
 John O'Hart, Irish Pedigrees. Dublin: James Duffy and Co. 5th edition, 1892.
 Eugene O'Keeffe (ed. and tr.), Eoganacht Genealogies from the Book of Munster. Cork. 1703. (available here)
 T. F. O'Rahilly, Early Irish History and Mythology. Dublin Institute for Advanced Studies. 1946.

Medieval Gaels from Ireland